One Foot in the Blues is a compilation album by the American rock band ZZ Top, released in 1994 (see 1994 in music). The album contains a selection of the band's songs which fall into the blues genre. With the exception of the songs taken from the Degüello, El Loco, Eliminator and Recycler albums, the 1987 digital remixes were used.

Track listing

Personnel

ZZ Top
Billy Gibbons – guitar, vocals
Dusty Hill – bass guitar, keyboards, backing vocals, lead vocal on "Hi Fi Mama"
Frank Beard – drums, percussion

Production
Producer – Bill Ham
Engineers – Robin Brian, Joe Hardy, Terry Manning
Mastering – Bob Ludwig
Design – Jeri Heiden
Liner notes – Bill Bentley, Frank Beard, Billy Gibbons, Dusty Hill

Charts

References

Albums produced by Bill Ham
ZZ Top compilation albums
1994 compilation albums
Warner Records compilation albums